Sport in Europe tends to be highly organized with many sports having professional leagues.
The origins of many of the world's most popular sports today lie in the codification of many traditional games, especially in Great Britain. However, a paradoxical feature of European sport is the remarkable extent to which local, regional and national variations continue to exist, and even in some instances to predominate.

Team sports

Association football

Association football is the most popular sport in almost all countries of Europe.
European national teams have won 12 of 21 editions of the FIFA World Cup. Italy and Germany have won four titles each, followed by France with two titles and England and Spain, each won the World Cup once.
UEFA, the governing body for European football, has hosted the UEFA European Championship since 1960, and the UEFA Women's Championship since 1984.

The most popular and successful football leagues are the English Premier League, the Spanish La Liga, the German Bundesliga, the Italian Serie A, the French Ligue 1 and the Portuguese Primeira Liga. Other main football leagues on the continent are the Russian Premier League, the Turkish Süper Lig and the Dutch Eredivisie. The top clubs in each league play the UEFA Champions League, while lower-ranked clubs compete in UEFA Europa League and the UEFA Europa Conference League.

Basketball

Basketball originated in America. It was invented in 1891 by Canadian James Naismith in Springfield, Massachusetts. In Europe, basketball is the second most popular team sport in many countries, including Greece, Serbia, Turkey and Spain. In Lithuania, it is the national sport. It is also very popular in Italy, France, Germany and all ex-Yugoslavia countries.

The EuroBasket is the main European basketball competition for men's national teams, first held in 1935. The Soviet Union and Yugoslavia have won the most titles, with Spain claiming three championships since the late 2000s.

The EuroLeague is the most important club basketball competition in Europe. it was founded as the FIBA European Champions Cup in 1958, but is organized by the Euroleague Basketball association since 2000. It is, globally, the second most popular basketball club competition, after the NBA.

Cricket

Cricket is a popular summer sport in the United Kingdom and has been exported to other parts of the former British Empire.  Cricket has its origins in south east Britain. It is popular throughout England and Wales, and parts of the Netherlands. Cricket is also popular in other areas and also played in Northwest Europe.

The England cricket team and Ireland cricket team are the only European teams with Test status. England's main rival is Australia, and they play each other in The Ashes series. England won the Cricket World Cup in 2019 and the ICC World Twenty20 in 2010.
Ireland has recently received Test status in 2017.

There is an ongoing surge on popularity of cricket due to vast investment in domestic T20 games and franchise based tournaments like Euro T20 Slam which will be played between city based teams of Ireland, Scotland Cyprus Cricket and Netherlands.

Field hockey

Field hockey is from England and is one of the most popular sports in Western Europe, The Netherlands and Germany have been champions in both world cups, Belgium has also been champion in the men's tournament, Germany is the most recent champion in Men's Hockey World Cup and The Netherlands is the most recent champion in Women's Hockey World Cup.

In the Olympics, Great Britain, The Netherlands and Germany have been champions in both tournaments, Spain has been the winner in the 1992 Women's tournament, Belgium is the most recent winner in the Men's tournament and The Netherlands is the most recent winner in the Women's tournament.

Handball
Handball is played professionally in several European countries. The European Handball Federation organizes continental competitions for men's and women's. European teams have dominated the IHF World Men's Handball Championship and have also won most editions of the IHF World Women's Handball Championship. Notable men's teams include Germany, France, Spain, Sweden, Denmark, Iceland, North Macedonia, Slovenia and Croatia, whereas Norway has dominated women's championships since the 2000s..

The EHF Champions League is the most important handball club competition for men's teams in Europe and involves the leading teams from the top European nations.

Ice hockey

Ice hockey is the most popular or one of the most popular sports in many European nations, including Czechia, Switzerland, Russia,  Sweden, Finland, Slovakia, Latvia, Belarus, and northern central Europe, where it rivals association football in popularity. It is also popular at a professional level in Germany, Norway, Austria, most of Western Europe and isolated parts of the former Soviet Union and Yugoslavia.

The Kontinental Hockey League originated from Russia but currently features teams from eight other countries. The Austrian Hockey League, Czech Extraliga, Deutsche Eishockey Liga, SM-Liiga, National League A and Swedish Hockey League are other professional leagues, whose top teams meet at the Champions Hockey League.

The Ice Hockey European Championships for national teams was played from 1910 to 1932. National teams currently play the Ice Hockey World Championships, where Russia / Soviet Union have claimed a combined 27 titles, the Czech Republic / Czechoslovakia 12 and Sweden 11.

Rugby league

Rugby league is popular in northern England, where the sport formed in 1895. The game is also popular in southern France.

The Great Britain national team first played in 1908, and entered the World Cup until 1992 and the Tri-Nations until 2006. England, Scotland and Wales have played independently since then. Great Britain has won the World Cup three times, whereas France has been runner-up twice.

Clubs from England and France compete in the only fully professional league, the Super League, as well as the Challenge Cup competition.

In addition to this, the game is also played semi-professionally and at amateur levels in Russia, Serbia, Wales, Scotland and Ireland.

Rugby union

Rugby union is popular in France, England, Wales, Scotland, Ireland, northern Italy and Georgia. The game is also relatively popular in Portugal, Spain, Netherlands, Belgium, Germany, Russia and Romania, as it is at a semi-professional level in these countries.

Europe's main competition for national teams is the Six Nations Championship, first held in 1883 as the Home Nations Championship. The other European national teams play at the Rugby Europe International Championships. The England national teams is the only European team to have won the Rugby World Cup, whereas France was runner-up three times and Wales reached the semifinals once.

The three main domestic rugby union competitions are the fully professional Premiership (England), Top 14 (France) and United Rugby Championship (URC)(Ireland, Scotland, Wales, Italy and South Africa). The European Rugby Champions Cup is the premier continental championship, with clubs qualifying from the three professional competitions.

Volleyball
European teams have won most editions of the FIVB Volleyball Men's World Championship, led by Italy with three wins. In the FIVB Volleyball Women's World Championship, the Soviet Union has won five editions, Russia two, and Italy and Serbia one each. The Soviet Union has won three men's gold medals and four women's gold medals at the Olympics.

The European Volleyball Confederation was founded in 1963, but the Men's European Volleyball Championship was first held in 1948 and the Women's European Volleyball Championship was first held in 1949, with the Soviet Union and Russia leading both in titles.

The CEV Champions League is held annually since the 1959-60 edition. Russian clubs VC CSKA Moscow and VC Zenit-Kazan won 13 and six editions respectively, while Italian clubs Modena Volley and Volley Treviso won four each. The CEV Women's Champions League is held since 1960–61. WVC Dynamo Moscow won 11 editions, Uralochka Ekaterinburg won eight, and Volley Bergamo won seven.

Water polo
Water polo is played professionally in several European countries. LEN organizes continental competitions for men's and women's. European teams have dominated the World Aquatics Championships and have also won several editions of the Women's Championship.

The LEN Champions League is the most important water polo club competition for teams in Europe and involves the leading teams from the top European nations.

Other sports
Other team sports like futsal, beach Soccer, roller hockey, baseball, and American football are also popular in some European countries.

Baseball is also gaining popularity in some countries, like in the United Kingdom, where the sport is reputed to have started in the 1800s before exploding in the United States.  In Spain, due to Latin American immigrants bringing the sport, particularly from countries like Cuba, Dominican Republic, and Venezuela. In countries like Italy, Ireland, and Germany, growth in the sport is partly due to influence from Italian Americans, Irish Americans, and German Americans. Other countries include France, Netherlands, and Greece, among others.

Some sport competitions features a European team gathering athletes from different European countries. These teams uses the European flag as an emblem. The most famous of these competitions is the Ryder Cup in golf. Other examples are the Laver Cup in tennis, the Mosconi Cup in pool, the Weber Cup in bowling, the IAAF Continental Cup in athletics, and the Continental Cup of Curling.

Reigning European champions

National teams

Clubs

European eSports 

eSports is becoming a more renowned sport. The popularity within recent years has sparked eSports as a competitive gaming system that participants (the athletes and gamblers) compete for recognition and awards. eSports is the word that related to the electronic sport and the leagues that compete through advertising games and related financial activities. The internet began to become popular in Europe around 1996, which is when online gaming start to find its market. It is characterized as a high-end competition where the athletes are paid an emolument for "competing" in computer games with digital graphics, a way for gaming as a sport to have a formal structure and broadcast. eSports began to be recognized as an official sport in 2003, to 13 years later, in 2016, being promoted by councils as part of fitness and leisure models. In Asia, China overtook Belarus and Malta as the world's largest eSports market in 2017. Europe has the fastest growing market, with 9.5 million eSport enthusiasts. It is said that training eSport skills is as patriotic as training the body for China, for sports like basketball, soccer, and many others and, just like all the other sporting events, eSport competitions get presented as media spectacles that "nurture the ideal patriotic citizen"[1] eSports were included in the 2018 Eastern European games as a demonstration sport (see - Esports at the 2018 Asian Games – Pro Evolution Soccer tournament) and will be implemented into the 2022 Hangzhou games as an official sport. Arenas are filled with crowds to spectate eSporting events, much like an arena would be filled for a basketball or football game. Fans of the sport go for interest and can also have a favorite athlete they want to see perform. eSports have also become a college major, where young adults are encouraged to dedicate their lives to online gaming. Over 70 million people watch eSports either online or on television globally, with one of the most popular games being League of Legends. There are eSport academies where people can go and improve strategies, as well as different techniques in countries such as Malaysia and Singapore. There is also an eSport festival, called eSports Festival Europa 2020, and every year Singapore hosts a large festival where you can come watch, or compete in gaming events. It usually is about 4 days long. Countries in Southern Europe have some of the most renowned PC players. This could be partly due to the fact that console gaming was banned for 15 years, so it was much more PC based and took off from there. Jang "MC" Min Chul is one of the worlds best StarCraft 2 players, from South Korea. He has made around $365,000 from StarCraft II tournaments dating back to 2010. Although it is widely accepted, some people still don't consider eSports as a sport because of the lack of physical activity/athletic ability, however, under the definition of sport, eSports qualifies.

Individual sports

The European Championships is a new multi-sport event which brings together the existing European Championships of some of the continent's leading sports, including Golf, Cycling, Athletics, Aquatics, and Gymnastics, every four years. The inaugural edition in 2018 will be staged by the host cities of Glasgow, Scotland and Berlin, Germany between 2 and 12 August.

Cycling

Road cycling is especially popular in France, Germany, Spain, Denmark, Italy, Belgium and the Netherlands. Nearly every UCI World Tour race is held in Europe, including the three Grands Tours: Tour de France, Vuelta a España and Giro d'Italia, as well as the five Monuments: Milan–San Remo, Tour of Flanders, Paris–Roubaix, Liège–Bastogne–Liège and Giro di Lombardia.

Notable road cyclists include Jacques Anquetil, Louison Bobet, Bernard Hinault, Alberto Contador, Miguel Indurain, Eddy Merckx, Gino Bartali, Alfredo Binda, Fausto Coppi, and Felice Gimondi.

Golf

The Open Championship, also known as the British Open, is one of the four major golf tournaments. Other notable golf tournaments in Europe include the BMW PGA Championship, Scottish Open, Irish Open, French Open and Italian Open, which are part of the European Tour.

Europe competes as a single team in the Ryder Cup and Solheim Cup versus the United States, and the Royal Trophy and EurAsia Cup versus Asia. Also, the Seve Trophy was played between the Great Britain and Ireland and the Continental Europe team.

Notable male golfers include Nick Faldo, Colin Montgomerie, Rory McIlroy, Pádraig Harrington, Ian Woosnam, Lee Westwood, Henrik Stenson, Bernhard Langer, Martin Kaymer, Seve Ballesteros, José María Olazábal and Miguel Ángel Jiménez. Notable female golfers include Annika Sörenstam, Laura Davies and Suzann Pettersen.

Motorsport

Motorsports are popular across nearly all of Europe. The Formula One, FIA World Endurance Championship, World Touring Car Championship, World Rally Championship and World Rallycross Championship are mainly held in Europe, and are traditionally dominated by European drivers and teams. Notable automobile races include the Monaco Grand Prix, Monte Carlo Rally, 24 Hours of Le Mans, 24 Hours Nürburgring and 24 Hours Spa.

Notable racecar drivers include Jackie Stewart, Alain Prost, Michael Schumacher, Sebastian Vettel, Lewis Hamilton, Jacky Ickx, Derek Bell, Tom Kristensen and Sébastien Loeb.

Motorcycle road racing is very popular in Europe, especially in the United Kingdom, Spain and Italy. Most of the Motorcycle Grand Prix are held in Europe. Italian riders Giacomo Agostini and Valentino Rossi are the two most successful of all time, with eight and seven 500cc / MotoGP World Championships respectively. On the Isle of Man, the Isle of Man TT and other road races held in closed public roads are very popular.

Motorcycle speedway is also popular in Poland, Scandinavia, the Czech Republic and the United Kingdom.

Tennis

Tennis is popular in most of Europe. Two of the four Grand Slam events are held in Europe: the Roland Garros in France and the Wimbledon Championships in the United Kingdom. The Rome Masters, Madrid Open, Italian Open and Paris Masters have ATP World Tour Masters 1000 events, whereas the Madrid Open and Italian Open are also WTA Tour Tier I events.

Notable male tennis players include Novak Djokovic, Roger Federer, Rafael Nadal, Andy Murray, Stefan Edberg, Boris Becker, Ivan Lendl and Björn Borg. Notable female tennis players include Steffi Graf, Maria Sharapova, Monica Seles, Justine Henin, Martina Hingis, Simona Halep, Ana Ivanovic, Victoria Azarenka, Caroline Wozniacki, Conchita Martínez, Angelique Kerber, Garbiñe Muguruza, Petra Kvitová, Arantxa Sánchez Vicario, and Iga Świątek.

Other sports

The most prestigious and lucrative athletics and aquatics meets are in Europe. The most prestigious sporting event related to athletics is the European Athletics Championships, wherein Mo Farah is the most successful individual athlete.

For those areas with the proper climate, winter sports are also an important. In Scandinavian and Alpine countries, various forms of skiing and snowboarding are popular.  European competitors have traditionally dominated at the Winter Olympics and the International Ski Federation World Championships.

Horse racing is very popular in the United Kingdom and France. Major events are the Royal Ascot, Cheltenham Festival, Epsom Derby, Grand National and Prix de l'Arc de Triomphe.

Other popular individual sports include snooker, darts, and boxing.

Traditional sports

Some regions have games that are particular to their home, for example Gaelic games in Ireland, Calcio storico in Italy, shinty in Scotland, pétanque in southern France, bandy in Russia and Scandinavia, Basque Pelota in Basque Country, or bullfighting in Spain.

Olympic Games
Europe was the birthplace of the Olympic Movement that has become so central to modern individual sport, with the International Olympic Committee founded in Switzerland in 1894 and Greece being the first country to hold the First Olympic Games. Europe has hosted a total of 30 Olympic Games (16 Summer and 14 Winter), more than any other region in the world.

During the Cold War, the Soviet Union, East Germany and other communist countries had a fierce rivalry in the Olympic Games with Western Europe and the United States. Notable events include the Blood in the Water match in 1956, the 1972 Olympic Men's Basketball Final, the Miracle on Ice in the 1980 Winter Olympics, and the 1980 and 1984 boycotts.

Club over franchise
Unlike major team sports in the United States and Canada, where franchises are awarded to nominated cities, most European teams have grown from small clubs formed by groups of individuals before growing rapidly. Churches, universities and work places have often been the most fertile birthplace of many of Europe's major sports clubs, particularly in Britain, which in latter part of the nineteenth century led the way in organised sports.

Clubs therefore had an equal chance to grow to become among the strongest in their particular sport, specially as in majority of popular sports promotion and relegation process exists and allows a plethora of places to compete for the top level. The cultural importance of the system has been demonstrated through the public rejection of the European Super League proposals in Spring 2021.

See also
European Championship
European Championships (multi-sport event)
European Games
Nations League
List of professional sports leagues by revenue
Team Europe
Sport policies of the European Union
Directorate-General for Education and Culture
Sport in Africa
Sport in Asia
Sport in Oceania
Sport in North America
Sport in South America

Notes

References